Bohumila is a given name, the feminine form of Bohumil. It is borne by:

 Bohumila Bloudilová (1876–1946), Czech portrait photographer
 Bohumila Grögerová (1921–2014), Czech and Czechoslovak poet and translator
 Bohumila Kapplová (born 1944), Czech Olympic canoer
 Bohumila Míla Myslíková (1933–2005), Czech actress
 Bohumila Řimnáčová (born 1947), Czech former gymnast

Czech feminine given names